Harold Scarboro (died February 21, 1944) was an American politician and newspaper editor from Maryland. He served as a member of the Maryland House of Delegates, representing Harford County from 1894 to 1896.

Early life
Harold Scarboro was born to Silas Scarboro. His father was a surgeon in the Civil War, school commissioner, and member of the Maryland House of Delegates.

Career
Scarboro was a Democrat. He served as a member of the Maryland House of Delegates, representing Harford County from 1894 to 1896.

Around 1894, Scarboro started his career in journalism with The Aegis. Scarboro worked as editor of the Harford Dispatch, a free silver paper. In June 1897, he became editor of the Baltimore Democrat. By 1900, he worked for the Baltimore Evening News. In 1905, Scarboro became the manager of The Towson News.

In 1905, Scarboro became manager of the newspaper The News by Robert Garrett. In 1917, Scarboro worked as a clerk in the office of the county commissioners in Towson. In 1918, Scarboro purchased The Union and combined it with The News. He sold The Union News of Towson in 1921 to Walter P. Reckord.

Personal life
Around 1900, Scarboro moved from Bel Air to Catonsville.

Scarboro died on February 21, 1944, at The Preston in Baltimore.

References

Year of birth missing
1944 deaths
People from Harford County, Maryland
Democratic Party members of the Maryland House of Delegates
Editors of Maryland newspapers